Samarra TV is an Iraqi satellite television channel based in Baghdad, Iraq. The channel was launched in 2013.

See also

Television in Iraq

References

External links
 Samarra TV Official website

Television stations in Iraq
Arab mass media
Arabic-language television stations
Television channels and stations established in 2013
Arab Spring and the media